Batrachedra substrata is a species of moth in the family Batrachedridae. It was described by Edward Meyrick in 1916 and is found in Sri Lanka.

References

Natural History Museum Lepidoptera generic names catalog

Batrachedridae
Moths of Sri Lanka
Moths described in 1916
Taxa named by Edward Meyrick